Andonian (Armenian: Աղաճանեան) is a patronymic surname that follows Armenian name conventions.  Notable people with this name include the following:

Aram Andonian (1875 – 1951), Armenian journalist, historian and writer
Gaël Andonian (born 1995), Armenian footballer

See also

Elmira Antonyan
Andorian

Armenian-language surnames